The Mad Thinker is a supervillain appearing in American comic books published by Marvel Comics. He is portrayed to be an evil genius specializing in robotics. He is sometimes referred to just as "The Thinker".

Publication history

The Mad Thinker was introduced by Stan Lee and Jack Kirby in Fantastic Four #15 (June 1963). Lee and Kirby gave the mad scientist a special ability to predict events to the precise second.

Little to nothing was known of his origins or true identity until, over fifty years later, the Mad Thinker's first name was revealed to be Julius in the pages of Brian Michael Bendis and Alex Maleev's Infamous Iron Man #2.

Fictional character biography
The professional criminal mastermind known as the Mad Thinker made his debut fighting the Fantastic Four. He once attempted to take over New York City using the Baxter Building as his base and all organized crime members as his lieutenants. The Fantastic Four were lured away from New York just before a meteorite struck the city and briefly knocked out electrical power, including the Baxter Building's defense systems. The Mad Thinker took the opportunity to create a robotic servant, the Awesome Android. He trapped the Fantastic Four in the lower quarters of the building but was eventually caught, after being stopped by an unforeseen factor: the building's mailman, Willie Lumpkin, who on Reed's orders rang a bell at 4 pm, activating a circuit breaker Reed had built into all his devices.

It seemed that his primary objective had not really been to take over the city, but to manipulate organized crime into helping him get into the Baxter building so that he could indulge his intellectual avarice by stealing the technology of Reed Richards. In that sense, the Fantastic Four did not really defeat him, they only defeated his pretext. The Mad Thinker would gladly get sent to prison for a peek at the secrets of what he considered the greatest mind in the world.

After his initial defeat against the Fantastic Four, the Mad Thinker teamed with the Puppet Master for the first time. He used the original X-Men through a mind-controlled Professor X to battle the Fantastic Four. Again with the Puppet Master, he pitted the Thing against the Human Torch, but was foiled by Reed Richards. Later he created a radio-controlled bouncing ball with which he tried to eliminate the Thing and Torch while they were at a new dam's opening and nearly brought down the ball, but the Torch was able to destroy it.

He then created Quasimodo, a "living" computer. He located and revived the original Human Torch and used him to battle the present-day Torch. Later, with his Triumvirate of Terror (consisting of Piledriver, Hammerhead, and Thunderboot), he captured the Avengers, and invaded Avengers Mansion, believing that he had successfully overcome them by remembering to take advantage of the human element of his enemies' personalities that he had forgotten in the past, but he was nevertheless foiled by the unexpected intervention of Hercules, who had only recently begun to stay with the Avengers following his exile from Olympus.

The Mad Thinker impersonated Dr. Jose Santini, and disrupted an attempt to cure the Thing, causing the Thing to turn against the Fantastic Four. However, the Mad Thinker was captured by Mister Fantastic and the Human Torch. From his prison cell, he sent a battle android called the Monster Android against the Fantastic Four, but the android was sent into the Negative Zone by Mister Fantastic.

He allied with the Puppet Master again and with Egghead in their attempted blackmail of the United States government using a laser-firing satellite and a giant android called "Gargan-Droid". Again with the Puppet Master, he attacked the Fantastic Four using androids of their past foes. With the Puppet Master, he then battled Spider-Man and the Thing.

The Mad Thinker then took part in the Black Lama's contest of super-villains, but was defeated by Iron Man. Mad Thinker then re-established control of his robot the Scavenger and sent it against the Fantastic Four. He was defeated by Thundra, Tigra, and Brute. He then battled the Thing, Daredevil, Vision, and Yellowjacket. With the Puppet Master and Wizard, he attempted to disrupt the wedding of the Human Torch and Alicia Masters. The Mad Thinker later took control of the computers in Fantastic Four headquarters, but was foiled by Mister Fantastic.

The Mad Thinker constructed android duplicates of his favorite thinkers in order to populate his own town called "Ponder" and had one of his robots bring Captain America to that town. Most of them were destroyed by Team America and Mad Thinker was arrested by S.H.I.E.L.D.

The Mad Thinker later refused involvement in Loki's "Acts of Vengeance". He instead escaped prison, and sent Gargantua against Wonder Man and the Wasp in an attempt to forestall the proposed Super-Powers Registration Act. Later, he attempted a robbery using robot dinosaurs, and was foiled by Destroyer and Tattletale of Power Pack.

The Mad Thinker became interested in the young super-group called the New Warriors, and posed them a riddle when they first formed. In the final issue of the series, the answer to the riddle was revealed: the Mad Thinker's nephew had accidentally gained uncontrollable superpowers from his lab, killing his mother in the process. Now, the Thinker wanted them to help him.

Since then, the Mad Thinker has been seen battling She-Hulk in a prison escape attempt. However, this Mad Thinker was revealed to be merely yet another android duplicate of the real Mad Thinker. Following the destruction of this android, the Awesome Android (now calling itself Awesome Andy) took custody of the android's still-functional head, until it was stolen by the teenage supervillain Southpaw.

Although willing to kill heroes who get in his way, there are lines the Mad Thinker will not cross. A partnership with the Wizard was cut short after the kidnapping of the child Franklin Richards. The Wizard wished to experiment upon Franklin and learn the secret of his vast powers. The Mad Thinker, however, claimed that this had an almost certain probability of Franklin's death. When the Wizard acknowledged this, but decided to continue anyway, an angry Thinker dissolved the partnership and helped lead Franklin's godfather, The Thing, to where the Wizard had the boy hostage.

When Spider-Man's dimwitted enemy Rhino had an operation that made him a genius Rhino broke the Mad Thinker out of jail so that Mad Thinker could work in Rhino's crime syndicate.

The Mad Thinker then allies himself with the Puppet Master, planning to strike against the Fantastic Four yet again. Told that he preferred to be called "The Thinker", The Puppet Master asked him why he had been called "The Mad Thinker" in the past. The reply was that he used to have "repressed anger issues". When the Puppet Master asks him about his anger, he replies that "it isn't repressed any more". He has built a device to amplify the Puppet Master's power so that they can escalate a battle between the two rival factions in the Super Hero Civil War.

In exchange for not being connected to the crimes on Yancy Street, Reed has the Mad Thinker double-check his calculations concerning the potential effects of not supporting the registration of all superheroes.

During the "Dark Reign" storyline, Quasimodo analyzed his creator for Norman Osborn. He recommended to Norman that he would lead a group against Mad Thinker if Norman wanted to go after him.

Mad Thinker, along with Awesome Android, later appear as members of the Intelligencia. Mad Thinker even created the Gammadroid which he used to help MODOK and Hulk Robot capture Red Hulk.

During a conflict between the Intelligencia and the Sinister Six as a prelude to the Ends of the Earth storyline, Mad Thinker was able to briefly deactivate Electro's powers, but was caught off-guard when Electro physically attacked him instead, the surprise of the attack allowing Electro to defeat him. He was presumably killed when Doctor Octopus used the Zero Cannon to launch him into space. MODOK Superior vows to find a way to restore his fellow Intelligencia members.

MODOK Superior was able to revive Mad Thinker and the other Intelligencia members where they began to formulate their plans after their predicted shatter of the superhero community.

During the Time Runs Out storyline, Mad Thinker was at some point contracted by Doctor Doom to be part of his attempts at uncovering the truth behind the Incursions. Thinker managed to tap into and map the Mapmakers network, allowing them to locate the source of the Incursions.

As part of the "All-New, All-Different Marvel," Mad Thinker appears as a member of Hood's incarnation of the Illuminati.

Sometime later, the Mad Thinker appears in La Paz, Bolivia where he is surprised by Doctor Doom in his version of the Iron Man armor, who offers him the chance to turn his life around in exchange for a device he used in a robot. Upon refusing, Mad Thinker activated a few robots to fight Doom only for him to be defeated. Mad Thinker is later shown to be in S.H.I.E.L.D. custody.

After escaping from S.H.I.E.L.D. custody, Mad Thinker became obsessed with Mister Fantastic's whereabouts when he hasn't returned to Earth-616 yet. Misinterpreting Mister Fantastic's absence, Mad Thinker thinks that Mister Fantastic wants Mad Thinker to succeed him and the Fantastic Four. While styling his hair after Mister Fantastic and calling himself by that name, Mad Thinker hired three people named Lumen, Goodfire, and Smash to make up his Fantastic Four and gives them powers similar to the Fantastic Four. Mad Thinker now has elasticity, Lumen can become invisible with the side-effect of distorting the perception of the environment around him if he loses control of his invisibility, Goodfire has a blue fiery plasma form which she can't turn off and can also fly in this form, and Smash possesses super-strength and enhanced durability while sporting gold-colored skin. He took his Fantastic Four to follow Human Torch and Thing on their multiverse travels in order to eliminate the old remnants of the Fantastic Four. Mad Thinker's Fantastic Four confronts Human Torch and Thing in an unidentified reality. Despite Human Torch and Thing being powerless at the time, the two of them held their own against Mad Thinker's Fantastic Four until they escaped.

Powers and abilities
The Mad Thinker does not have superhuman powers. However, he is an extraordinary genius with knowledge of technology centuries beyond conventional science, for reasons unexplained. He has an eidetic memory and can rapidly organize and correlate vast amounts of information and perceive non-obvious patterns. He has the facilities and means to create all manner of sophisticated weaponry, androids, armor, and vehicles.

His analytical, mathematical, and geometrical abilities are of a sophisticated order not commonly found on Earth. He is particularly adept at computers, robotics, and artificial intelligence, with Ph.D.s in computer science and engineering. He has constructed his own android Awesome Android and twice resurrected the original Human Torch. He also built Quasimodo and the Scavenger, and various other equipment as needed, including monocle-sized hypno-lenses. In addition to his own achievements he has stolen much of the secret technology of Reed Richards, back in the incident when he took over the Baxter building.

The Mad Thinker is also a proficient disguise artist. Through a surgically implanted radio link, he is able to project his consciousness into an android simulacrum of himself.

The Thinker's intricate plans are most often foiled by what he refers to as the x-factor, or human unpredictability. Also the Thinker is not an intuitive genius (e.g., Reed Richards) and is thus incapable of true invention; instead, he synthesizes for his own use the creations of others (e.g., his android creations are based on discoveries of Reed Richards).

The Mad Thinker is able to escape from prison with little difficulty. He often uses his thoughts to control a robot at a remote, secret base. This gives him an alibi—he is already in prison.

Mad Thinker's robots and androids
The following robots and androids were created by Mad Thinker:

 Android Man - An android created by Mad Thinker as a fail-safe in the event that he was betrayed by Wizard.
 Awesome Android - 
 Gammadroid - An android that is powered by a combination of gamma energies and cosmic energies. Mad Thinker can control Gammadroid with his mind and have it do any heavy-lifting jobs for him.
 "Gargan-Droid" - A giant robot that was created by Mad Thinker at the time when he collaborated with Egghead and Puppet Master.
 Mad Thinker's Intellectual Robots - A group of robots that were modeled after history's greatest thinkers.
 Alpha - The protector of the Intellectual Robots who was built by the Mark Twain robot. He has a mace-like right hand. Alpha managed to defeat Spider-Man in battle and held his own against Vision.
 Abraham Lincoln Robot - A robot that is modeled after Abraham Lincoln.
 Albert Einstein Robot - A robot that is modeled after Albert Einstein.
 Confucius Robot - A robot that is modeled after Confucius.
 Friedrich Nietzsche Robot - A robot that is modeled after Friedrich Nietzsche.
 Fyodor Dostoyevsky Robot - A robot that is modeled after Fyodor Dostoyevsky.
 Leonardo da Vinci Robot - A robot that is modeled after Leonardo da Vinci.
 Mark Twain Robot - A robot that is modeled after Mark Twain. After the robots were destroyed by Team America, it was revealed that the Mark Twain Robot survived and rebuilt his fellow robots in an underground laboratory that was previously used by Mad Thinker.
 Niccolò Machiavelli Robot - A robot that is modeled after Niccolò Machiavelli.
 Plato Robot - A robot that is modeled after Plato.
 Sigmund Freud Robot - A robot that is modeled after Sigmund Freud.
 Socrates Robot - A robot that is modeled after Socrates.
 Virginia Woolf Robot - A robot that is modeled after Virginia Woolf.
 William Shakespeare Robot - A robot that is modeled after William Shakespeare.
 Monster Android - A 12 ft. android created by Mad Thinker and classified as his most powerful android creation.
 Quasimodo - A computer that was created by Mad Thinker in his base in the Mojave Desert and abandoned by him. It was given a humanoid body by Silver Surfer.

Other versions

Ultimate Marvel
In the Ultimate Marvel imprint, the Baxter Building was the home of a Think Tank of young geniuses, funded by the US Government. A girl named Rhona Burchill was considered for the project, but was denied due to her borderline psychotic tendencies. Enraged, she went home and concocted an accelerant that would allow her to think many times faster. Needing more brain mass to handle the drug, she anesthetized her brother Bobby, and using a crude surgical technique, cut out portions of his brain and grafted them onto her own. Claiming that "You don't need a Think Tank - You just need a thinker", she attacks the Baxter Building and lays a trap that ensnares the Fantastic Four, several soldiers and Fantastic Four supervisor Lt. Lumpkin. When she tells her story in her now stream of consciousness speech pattern to the Four, Reed calls her mad. She replies, "If it's mad to think the unthinkable, then I'm the maddest thinker there ever was". Based on this comment, she has since been referred to as the Mad Thinker.

She also appeared as the villain in the Ultimate X4 miniseries which showed her with an android resembling the Awesome Android which she calls Robby. During this appearance she attempted to steal Cerebro and use it to gain control of all the minds on the planet, but, with the aid of Wolverine, Shadowcat and Iceman, the Fantastic Four were able to distract her until Reed could reprogram Cerebro to cause Rhona to develop the power of empathy rather than control, forcing her to shut Cerebro down or lose herself amid the pain of the world. Though she attempts to escape, Wolverine had cut a certain hose in her escape vehicle, causing it to explode on her when she activates the after burners.

What If?
In a parody issue of What If?, the entry entitled "Spidey Intellectual Stories" (a send-up of The Electric Company's Spidey Super Stories) has Spider-Man defeating the Mad Thinker by debating philosophy, severely boring the observing Uatu the Watcher.

In other media

Television
 The Mad Thinker appears in the "Iron Man" segment of The Marvel Super Heroes, voiced by Len Carlson.
 The Mad Thinker appears in The Avengers: Earth's Mightiest Heroes, voiced by Danny Mann. Introduced in the episode "The Man in the Ant Hill," the Mad Thinker is incarcerated at the Big House before escaping in "Breakout, Part 1" alongside his fellow inmates.
 A variation of Rhona Burchill appears in Iron Man: Armored Adventures, voiced by Brenna O'Brien. This version is a goth who attempted to destroy the Baxter School in her youth before being sent to Ravencroft. She escaped, built the android Andy to act as her "brother", and took on the identity of Rhona Erwin, the smartest student at Tomorrow Academy until Tony Stark enrolled. Burchill and Andy initially make minor appearances throughout season two until the episode "All the Best People are Mad", when they place Stark's friends in various death traps and force him to save them as part of her Deadly Aptitude Tests (D.A.T.s) so she can prove her intellectual superiority over him. When Stark succeeds in saving his friends and disarming a bomb Burchill had set up, she sends Andy to eliminate them and utilizes a laser gun based on Hank Pym's technology. However, Iron Man damages Andy, devastating Burchill. As she is arrested by the FBI, she vows revenge before being taken away by another of her androids disguised as a Ravencroft doctor.

Miscellaneous
The Mad Thinker appears in The Avengers: Earth's Mightiest Heroes tie-in comic.

References

External links
 Mad Thinker at Marvel.com
 Mad Thinker (Rhona Burchill) at Marvel.com
 Mad Thinker at Marvel Wiki
 Mad Thinker (Rona Burchill) at Marvel Wiki
 Mad Thinker at Comic Vine

Characters created by Jack Kirby
Characters created by Stan Lee
Comics characters introduced in 1963
Fictional mad scientists
Fictional roboticists
Marvel Comics scientists
Marvel Comics supervillains